Nolatrexed is a thymidylate synthase inhibitor.

References

4-Pyridyl compounds
Thioethers
Quinazolines
Lactones
Thymidylate synthase inhibitors